According to Catholic lore, Trophimus of Arles was the first bishop of Arles, in today's southern France.

History
It was an early tradition of the Catholic Church that under the co-Emperors Decius and  Herennius Etruscus (251 AD), Pope Fabian sent out seven bishops from Rome to Gaul, to preach the Gospel: Gatien to Tours, Trophimus to Arles, Paul to Narbonne, Saturninus to Toulouse, Denis to Paris, Austromoine to Clermont, and Martial to Limoges.

Gregory of Tours, apparently quoting from the Acta of Saint Saturninus, says in effect that Trophimus arrived in Gaul with the first bishops of Tours, Paris, and other cities after the middle of 3rd century, in the consulate of Decius and Gratus.

From the mid-fifth century local tradition has assimilated Trophimus of Arles with the Trophimus mentioned in the Acts of the Apostles as a companion of Paul the Apostle. The Martyrium romanum identifies him as the disciple of Paul, but the identification is spurious. Trophîme, as he is in French, does not rate a biography in the Catholic Encyclopedia, but the church at Arles dedicated to him, built from the 12th century onwards over a third-century crypt, is one of the monuments of Romanesque architecture and sculpture in Provence. In its cloister a corner figure in the north gallery, dated about 1180, represents Trophimus.

Trophimus is considered by the Catholic Church the protector of those with gout.

Notes

References

Sources

External links

TROPHIMUS of Arles
Saint Trophime: numerous photos of the Romanesque architecture

Bishops of Arles
3rd-century bishops in Gaul
3rd-century Christian saints
Gallo-Roman saints